Dixie is an unincorporated community in Idaho County, Idaho, United States, located  east-northeast of Riggins.  Dixie was an important gateway to the Thunder Mountain Mines of Idaho during the early 1900s when Dixie was on the northern terminus of the Three Blaze Trail, a shortcut route to the mines via Campbell's Ferry, and what is now the Frank Church-River of No Return Wilderness, Chamberlain Basin, and southward to the mining community of Roosevelt, located on Monumental Creek.

History
Dixie's population was 292 in 1909, and was 25 in 1960.

Climate
Dixie has a dry summer continental subarctic climate (Dsc) according to the Köppen climate classification system.

Transportation

Airports
The following public-use airports are located near Dixie
 Dixie USFS Airport (A05)
 Wilson Bar USFS Airport (C48)

References

Unincorporated communities in Idaho County, Idaho
Unincorporated communities in Idaho